The tit hylia (Pholidornis rushiae) is a species of bird, monotypic within the genus Pholidornis. It is found in rainforests in West and Central Africa. It had been placed in the family Cettiidae, but in 2019 its assignment to a new family, the Hyliidae, was strongly supported.

Taxonomy
The tit hylia was described by John Cassin in 1855 as Diceum Rushiæ based on a specimen collected from present-day Gabon. It was placed in the genus Pholidornis by Gustav Hartlaub two years later. Its generic name is derived from the Ancient Greek pholidos for scale and ornis for bird.

Distribution and habitat
It is found in Angola, Benin, Cameroon, Central African Republic, Republic of the Congo, Democratic Republic of the Congo, Ivory Coast, Equatorial Guinea, Gabon, Ghana, Guinea, Liberia, Nigeria, Sierra Leone, Togo, and Uganda. Its natural habitat is subtropical or tropical moist lowland forest.

Description
This species has a pale buff chest and head overlaid with heavy brown streaking. From the lower breast down to the rump, this bird is bright yellow. The legs are a bright orange color. Juveniles are less colorful and less heavily streaked. Due to its small size it sometimes gets trapped in spider webs.

Behaviour

Feeding
It is social, feeding in small flocks of up to seven birds (although very rarely with other species). It feeds on insects, with scale insects (family Coccoidea) being an important part of the diet.

Breeding

The tit hylia is a monogamous breeder, and a report from Angola has suggested that it may engage in cooperative breeding as well. The entrance is a spout hanging from the bottom. The nest is situated  up a tree. The nests are well made and strongly bound to the branches they are found on. Two eggs are laid, although there is no information about the incubation, up to four adults have been reported feeding the chicks, and the nest is used for roosting after the breeding season.

References

tit hylia
Birds of the Gulf of Guinea
Birds of Central Africa
Birds of West Africa
tit hylia
Taxonomy articles created by Polbot